Gyöngyi Likerecz (born May 28, 1983 in Oroszlány, Komárom-Esztergom) is a retired female weightlifter from Hungary. She twice competed for her native country at the Summer Olympics (2000 and 2004) in the women's heavyweight division (– 75 kg). Likerecz was named Hungarian Sportswoman of the Year in 2001 after having won the world title the same year in Antalya, Turkey.

References
 sports-reference

1983 births
Living people
Hungarian female weightlifters
Weightlifters at the 2000 Summer Olympics
Weightlifters at the 2004 Summer Olympics
Olympic weightlifters of Hungary
World Weightlifting Championships medalists
21st-century Hungarian women